Thitarodes caligophilus is a species of moth of the family Hepialidae. It is found in Bhutan. It is a host of the entomopathogenic fungus Ophiocordyceps sinensis, a species of the genus Cordyceps. The fruiting bodies of Ophiocordyceps sinensis are used extensively in Traditional Chinese medicine. As a result, T. caligophilus-sourced Cordyceps harvested in Bhutan have become "widely used".

References

Moths described in 2010
Hepialidae